A diose is a monosaccharide containing two carbon atoms.  Because the general chemical formula of an unmodified monosaccharide is (C·H2O)n, where n is three or greater, it does not meet the formal definition of a monosaccharide. However, since it does fit the formula (C·H2O)n, it is sometimes thought of as the most basic sugar.

There is only one possible diose, glycolaldehyde (2-hydroxyethanal), which is an aldodiose (a ketodiose is not possible since there are only two carbons).

See also 
 Triose
 Tetrose
 Pentose
 Hexose
 Heptose

References

Monosaccharides